Alan Ernest Leofric Chorlton (24 February 1874 – 6 October 1946) was a British mechanical engineer and Conservative Party politician, and was involved in the development of the internal combustion engine.

Chorlton was born in Audenshaw, Lancashire. He was educated privately and at the mechanical engineering department of Manchester Technical School. He served an apprenticeship at Mather and Platt's ironworks in Salford, while studying part-time at Victoria University, Manchester.

At the age of 24 he became a consulting engineer to Hubbard Textile Printing Works, St Petersburg, Russia. He returned to England and the Salford Iron Works where he rose to become general works manager and was largely responsible for redesigning the Mather-Reynolds pump manufactured at the plant.

In 1913 he moved to Ruston and Hornsby at Lincoln. During the First World War he was appointed Deputy Controller of Aero Engines at the Ministry of Munitions. In 1917 he was awarded a Telford Premium medal by the Institution of Civil Engineers, and was made a Commander of the Order of the British Empire for his wartime services. He was also awarded the Cross of an Officer of the Order of the Crown of Italy.

From 1918 to 1928 he worked for William Beardmore and Company designing high speed diesel engines. These engines had various applications ranging from use in railcars to the R101 airship.

In 1929 he was nominated as Conservative candidate for the parliamentary constituency of Manchester Platting. Although unsuccessful on this occasion, two years later he was elected as Platting's Member of Parliament (MP), unseating the sitting Labour member, John Clynes. He was elected President of the Institute of Mechanical Engineers in 1933.

At the 1935 election, Chorlton was elected MP for Bury. In 1939 he announced he would not be standing for parliament again. He remained Bury's member of parliament until he stood down at the next election in 1945, which was delayed due to the Second World War.

A E L Chorlton retired from politics in 1945, and died in the following year, aged seventy-two.

References

External links

Conservative Party (UK) MPs for English constituencies
1874 births
1946 deaths
UK MPs 1931–1935
UK MPs 1935–1945
People from Audenshaw